Lea Massari, born Anna Maria Massetani (born 30 June 1933) is an actress and singer from Italy.

Massari was born Anna Maria Massetani in Rome, but changed her name to Lea Massari when she was 22 after the death of her fiancé Leo. She studied architecture in Switzerland.

Massari became known in art cinema for two roles: the missing girl Anna in Michelangelo Antonioni's L'avventura (1960), and as Clara, the mother of a sexually precocious 14-year-old boy named Laurent (Benoît Ferreux) in Louis Malle's Murmur of the Heart (1971).

Massari worked in both Italian and French cinema. Her career includes Sergio Leone's debut The Colossus of Rhodes  (Il Colosso di Rodi, 1961) and international commercial films such as The Things of Life (Les choses de la vie, 1970).

Massari was a member of the jury at the Cannes Film Festival in 1975.

After appearing in Francesco Rosi's Christ Stopped at Eboli  (Cristo si è fermato a Eboli, 1979), Massari won the Nastro d'Argento Best supporting Actress award.

Partial filmography

 Proibito (1955) – Agnese Barras
 Dreams in a Drawer (1957) – Lucia Moretti
 Resurrection (1958) – Marja Pawlowna
 L'avventura (1960) – Anna
 From a Roman Balcony (1960) – Freja
 Il Colosso di Rodi (1961) – Diala
 A Difficult Life (1961) – Elena Pavinato
 Morte di un bandito (1961) – Santa
 Dreams Die at Dawn (1961) – Anna Miklos
 Le Monte-charge (1962) – Marthe Dravet
 The Four Days of Naples (1962) – Maria (uncredited)
 The Captive City (1962) – Lelia Mendores
 Weeping for a Bandit (1964) – María Jerónima
 L'Insoumis (1964) – Dominique Servet
 La coda del diavolo (1964)
 Le Soldatesse (1965) – Toula Demantritza
 Made in Italy (1965) – Monica (segment "1 'Usi e costumi', episode 3")
 Il giardino delle delizie (1967) – Carlo's mistress
 Volver a vivir (1968) – María
 I Want Him Dead (1968) – Aloma
 Les Choses de la vie (1970) – Catherine Bérard
 Céleste (1970) – Hélène
 Senza via d'uscita (1970) – Britt
 Murmur of the Heart (1971) – Clara Chevalier
 Paolo e Francesca (1971)
 And Hope to Die (1972) – Sugar
 La prima notte di quiete (1972) – Monica
 La Femme en bleu (1973) – Aurélie
  (1973) – Maria Menela
  (1973) – Maria
 Story of a Love Story (1973) – Woman
  (1974) – Hélène Noblet
 Allonsanfàn (1974) – Charlotte
 Peur sur la ville (1975) – Nora Elmer
 Chi dice donna dice donna (1976) – Gilbert (segment "Papa e maman")
  (1976) – Gloria
 La linea del fiume (1976) – Amanda Treves
  (1977) – Mère de François
 Repérages (1977) – Cecilia
 El perro (1977) – Muriel
 Antonio Gramsci: The Days of Prison (1977) – Tania
 Dirty Dreamer (1978) – Joséphe
 Les Rendez-vous d'Anna (1978) – La mère d'Anna
 Christ Stopped at Eboli (1979) – Luisa Levi
 Le Divorcement (1979) – Rosa
 La Flambeuse (1981) – Louise
  (1983) – Carla Angelli
  (1984) – Nelly
 Segreti segreti (1984) – Marta, Laura's Mother
 Viaggio d'amore (1990) – Zaira (final film role)

References

External links
 

1933 births
Living people
Italian film actresses
Nastro d'Argento winners
Actresses from Rome
20th-century Italian actresses
Italian women singers
People of Umbrian descent